Henrietta Leyser  is an English historian. She is an expert on the history of medieval England, in particular the role of women.

Career
Leyser is an Emeritus fellow at St Peter's College, Oxford and a Fellow of the Royal Historical Society. 

Leyser was W. John Bennett Distinguished Visiting Scholar at the Institute and the Centre for Medieval Studies at the Pontifical Institute of Medieval Studies, 2011-12. She was a Distinguished Visitor at the Centre of Medieval Studies, University of Toronto (January-April 2012). Leyser has contributed biographies to the Oxford Dictionary of National Biography.

In 2011, she received a Festschrift entitled Motherhood, Religion, and Society in Medieval Europe, 400-1400: Essays Presented to Henrietta Leyser, edited by her son Conrad Leyser and Lesley Smith (Farnham: Ashgate).

She was married to the historian Karl Leyser (1920–92). Their children are Dame Ottoline Leyser, Regius Professor of Botany, and Conrad Leyser, also a medieval historian.

Select bibliography
 (1984) Hermits and the New Monasticism: A Study of Religious Communities in Western Europe, 1000-1150, Macmillan, 
 (1995) Medieval Women: A Social History of Women in England 450-1500, Weidenfeld & Nicolson, 
 (2001) co-edited with Richard Gameson, Belief and Culture in the Middle Ages: Studies Presented to Henry Mayr-Harting. New York: Oxford University Press.
(2005) co-edited with Samuel Fanous, Christina of Markyate: A Twelfth Century Holy Woman, London & New York: Routledge,
(2015) Beda: A Journey to the Seven Kingdoms at the Time of Bede, Head of Zeus, 
 (2016) A Short History of the Anglo-Saxons, I.B. Tauris Short Histories,

References

British medievalists
Women medievalists
British women historians
Living people
Fellows of St Peter's College, Oxford
Place of birth missing (living people)
Year of birth missing (living people)
Fellows of the Royal Historical Society